Gian dos Santos Martins (born 2 April 1993),  or simply Gian, is a Brazilian professional footballer who plays as a central midfielder for Ironi Kiryat Shmona.

Career

Club
On 27 January 2020, FC Okzhetpes announced the signing of Gian on a contract until the end of the 2020 season.

On 21 January 2022, FC Kyzylzhar announced the signing of Gian.

References

External links
 

1993 births
Living people
Footballers from Porto Alegre
Brazilian footballers
Association football midfielders
Grêmio Esportivo Brasil players
A.D. Sanjoanense players
C.F. União players
F.C. Paços de Ferreira players
FC Taraz players
FC Okzhetpes players
FC Kyzylzhar players
Hapoel Ironi Kiryat Shmona F.C. players
Primeira Liga players
Liga Portugal 2 players
Campeonato de Portugal (league) players
Kazakhstan Premier League players
Israeli Premier League players
Brazilian expatriate footballers
Expatriate footballers in Portugal
Expatriate footballers in Kazakhstan
Expatriate footballers in Israel
Brazilian expatriate sportspeople in Portugal
Brazilian expatriate sportspeople in Kazakhstan
Brazilian expatriate sportspeople in Israel